Utricularia fimbriata is a small to medium-sized, probably perennial carnivorous plant that belongs to the genus Utricularia. U. fimbriata is endemic to Colombia and Venezuela. It was originally described and published by Carl Sigismund Kunth in 1818. In 1913, John Hendley Barnhart treated this species as part of a new genus, Aranella, which was later reduced to the taxonomic rank of section within the genus Utricularia, thus bringing the species back to the original genus.

See also 
 List of Utricularia species

References 

Carnivorous plants of South America
Flora of Colombia
Flora of Venezuela
fimbriata